Stratford is a town in Fairfield County, Connecticut, United States. It is situated on Long Island Sound at the mouth of the Housatonic River. Stratford is in the Bridgeport–Stamford–Norwalk Metropolitan Statistical Area. It was settled by Puritans in 1639.

The population was 52,355 as of the 2020 census. It is bordered on the west by Bridgeport, to the north by Trumbull and Shelton, and on the east by Milford (across the Housatonic River). Stratford has a historical legacy in aviation, the military, and theater.

History

Founding and Puritan era
Stratford was founded in 1639 by Puritan leader Reverend Adam Blakeman, William Beardsley, and either 16 families (according to legend) or approximately 35 families (suggested by later research) who had recently arrived in Connecticut from England seeking religious freedom. In 1639 the General Court in Hartford made reference to the town as the "new plantation at Pequannock". In 1640 the community was known as Cupheag, a Native American Paugussett word meaning "at the enclosed place" or "place of shelter". By April 13, 1643, the growing town was known as Stratford, changed to honor William Shakespeare's birthplace of Stratford-upon-Avon in England.

Stratford is one of many towns in the northeastern American colonies founded as part of the Great Migration in the 1630s when Puritan families fled an increasingly polarized England in the decade before the civil war between Charles I and Parliament. Some of the Stratford settlers were from families who had first moved from England to the Netherlands to seek religious freedom, like their predecessors on the Mayflower, and decided to come to the New World when their children began to adopt the Dutch culture and language.

Like other Puritan or Pilgrim towns founded during this time, early Stratford was a place where church leadership and town leadership were united under the pastor of the church, in this case Reverend Blakeman. The goal of these communities was to create perfect outposts of religious idealism where the wilderness would separate them from the interference of kings, parliaments, or any other secular authority.

Blakeman ruled Stratford until his death in 1665, but as the second generation of Stratford grew up, many of the children rejected what they perceived as the exceptional austerity of the town's founders. This and later generations sought to change the religious dictums of their elders, and the utopian nature of Stratford and similar communities was gradually replaced with more standard colonial administration. By the late 17th century, the Connecticut government had assumed political control over Stratford.

Many descendants of the original founding Puritan families remain in Stratford today after over 350 years; for centuries they often intermarried within the original small group of 17th century Pilgrim families. Despite its Puritan origins, Stratford was the site of the first Anglican church in Connecticut, founded in 1707 and ministered by the Rev. Dr. Samuel Johnson. Settlers from Stratford went on to found other American cities and towns, including Newark, New Jersey, established in 1666 by members of the Stratford founding families who believed the town's religious purity had been compromised by the changes after Blakeman's death. Other towns such as Cambria, New York (now Lockport, New York) were founded or expanded around new churches by Stratford descendants taking part in the westward migration. U.S. President Gerald Ford was a descendant of one of the Stratford founding families, that was led by William Judson.

Towns created from Stratford
Stratford was one of the two principal settlements in southwestern Connecticut, the other being Fairfield. Over time it gave rise to several new towns that broke off and incorporated separately. The following towns were created from parts of Stratford:
 Shelton (originally Ripton) in 1789. In 1789 Ripton Parish separated from Stratford and became the Town of Huntington.
Monroe created from Huntington in 1823
 Nichols (originally Unity in 1725, then North Stratford in 1744)
 Long Hill, (merged with Unity to form North Stratford in 1744)
Trumbull, North Stratford separated from Stratford and became the town of Trumbull in 1797
 Bridgeport (also partly from Fairfield) in 1821

Nineteenth and Twentieth Centuries

A trolley was built connecting Lordship to Bridgeport in 1914, connecting the resort area to the neighboring city.

Geography

Coastline and islands
The town contains five islands, all in the Housatonic River. These are Carting Island, Long Island, Peacock Island, and Pope's Flat north of Interstate 95, as well as Goose Island. None of these islands are habitable because of their low elevations. A sixth island known as Brinsmade Island washed away prior to 1964.

Beaches
The central part of the beach is a nature preserve whose land is set aside for wildlife, particularly nesting raptors, such as American kestrels and ospreys. The western end of the beach was once the site of about 40 cottages, which were abandoned because of the town's discontinuation of the lease to the land. The cottages were demolished in fall 2010.

Russian Beach – Located between Long and Short beaches, Russian Beach has parking and the Point-No-Point walkway. Fishing is allowed, as is swimming although this beach has no lifeguards.

It has three picnic pavilions, basketball courts, tennis courts, volleyball courts, a handicapped-accessible playground, a skateboard park, a lighted softball field, a soccer field, two baseball fields and a lacrosse field. The beach has  of frontage with a concession stand, bathrooms, a deck and lifeguards. The park is also home to Short Beach Golf Course, a nine-hole par-3 course.

Great Salt Marsh
The Great Meadows Unit of the Stewart B. McKinney National Wildlife Refuge is a key bird migration stopover. The open water area of the Great Salt Marsh is known as Lewis Gut.

Neighborhoods
 Beaver Dam
 Birdseye
 Floral Park
 Hawley Lane (shared with Trumbull)
 Historic District
 Hollister Heights
 Lordship
 Long Beach
 Oronoque
 Oronoque Hills
 Oronoque Village
 Paradise green
 Peck's Mill
 Putney
 South End
 Stony Brook Gardens
 Stratford Center
 Stratford Downtown
 Success Village
 Wooster Park

Roosevelt Forest
Located in the north end of Stratford, this  site is primarily a mixed deciduous forest, with some wetlands and ponds. Named for President Franklin D. Roosevelt, it was set aside in the 1930s, when much of the infrastructure was created as a Works Progress Administration project. The forest includes campsites with cooking pits, picnic tables, a playground, restrooms, and walking trails.

Superfund sites

Stratford is the location of two Superfund sites designated by the United States Environmental Protection Agency. These include a variety of locations related to asbestos dumping and disposal by Raymark Industries, whose manufacturing was previously headquartered in Stratford, and the former Stratford Army Engine Plant. The Raymark site is on the EPA's National Priorities List. Stratford Army Engine Plant is not on the National Priorities list, but is being cleaned up by the US Army.

From 1919 to 1989, Raymark manufactured brake pads and other friction products for the automobile industry under the name Raybestos. The company disposed of wastes containing lead, asbestos, PCBs and other hazardous substances at its Stratford manufacturing plant. Raymark dried the waste material and made it available for use as fill material for lawns, playgrounds, and schoolyards. In 1993, the EPA and the Connecticut Department of Environmental Protection began working together to complete the cleanup of contamination Raymark left behind in Stratford. EPA completed its cleanup of the contaminated residential properties in 1995 and the former Raymark plant property in 1997. Plans for cleanup of the Ferry Creek area and surrounding properties where additional Raymark waste was historically disposed are currently being developed by the EPA. The cost of cleaning up the Raymark Site is estimated to have exceeded $200 million.

Demographics

As of the census of 2010, there were 51,384 people, 20,095 households, and 13,614 families residing in the town. The racial makeup of the town was 76.4% White, 14.3% Black or African American, 0.2% Native American, 2.4% Asian, 0.1% Pacific Islander, 4.2% from other races, and 2.5% from two or more races. Hispanic or Latino of any race were 13.8% of the population.

There were 20,095 households, out of which 28.2% had children under the age of 18 living with them, 49.1% were married couples living together, 14.2% had a female householder with no husband present, and 32.3% were non-families. 27.3% of all households were made up of individuals, and 13.5% had someone living alone who was 65 years of age or older. The average household size was 2.54 and the average family size was 3.11.

In the town, the population was spread out, with 23.0% under the age of 18, 5.8% from 18 to 24, 28.5% from 25 to 44, 23.5% from 45 to 64, and 19.2% who were 65 years of age or older. The median age was 42.2 years. For every 100 females, there were 89.0 males. For every 100 females age 18 and over, there were 85.6 males. The median income for a household in the town was $53,494, and the median income for a family was $64,364. Males had a median income of $45,552 versus $34,575 for females. The per capita income for the town was $26,501. About 3.5% of families and 5.0% of the population were below the poverty line, including 5.6% of those under age 18 and 5.8% of those age 65 or over.

Industry
In 1939, one of the world's first successful commercial helicopters was developed in Stratford by Igor Sikorsky and flown at his plant. His company, Sikorsky Aircraft Corporation, is still the town's largest employer. Also in 1939, Lycoming produced Wright radial engines here. After World War II, the plant was converted to produce turbines.

The Vought-Sikorsky Aircraft Division in Stratford built a total of 7,829 F4U fighters from 1940 to 1952, including the prototype. These planes saw extensive combat in the Pacific Theatre of operations during World War II, and played a supporting role in the Korean War. A Corsair sits on a pedestal at the airport as a memorial to the war effort.

The Stratford Eagles Composite Squadron, Civil Air Patrol, is based in Stratford, at the Sikorsky Memorial Airport.

Athletic Brewing Company, the leading U.S. manufacturer of non-alcoholic craft beer, with a 61% market share in 2021 is based in Stratford.

Sikorsky Aircraft

Stratford is home to the headquarters of Sikorsky Aircraft, a Lockheed Martin (LMT) subsidiary founded by Igor Sikorsky, developer of the first successful American helicopter. Every Marine One (the helicopter of the President of the United States) has been manufactured in Stratford since 1957. On July 20, 2015, Lockheed Martin announced an agreement to purchase Sikorsky Aircraft from UTC for $9 billion.

Stratford Army Engine Plant
The Stratford Army Engine Plant (SAEP) was a U.S. Army Tank-Automotive and Armaments Command installation and manufacturing facility, located along the Housatonic River and Main Street opposite Sikorsky Airport. Because of the Base Realignment and Closure actions of the United States Department of Defense, closure of the plant was recommended in July 1995. The SAEP closed on September 30, 1998. For the next 11 years the Army was involved with "Team Stratford" to develop the property. The United States Army, which owns the  site, auctioned it off on March 19, 2008, with a winning bid of $9,612,000 which also includes the  facility of over fifty buildings. This bid failed to be paid off and is now being placed for rebid. Currently Robert Hartmann of Hartmann Development has a $1 billion plan to develop the former Army engine plant into a destination resort.

Transportation

Air
Although owned by the City of Bridgeport, Sikorsky Memorial Airport is located in Stratford. The  facility includes two paved runways (both under 4800 feet), a helipad, and two hangars. It provides helicopter service to New York and the Downtown Manhattan Heliport and is used as a landing site for blimps and small aircraft. In 2019, 155 aircraft were based at the airport, with an average of 136 operations per day.

Rail
Average travel time into Manhattan is about 90 minutes. The station platforms are only long enough to handle four cars and the station has limited parking for fewer than 300 vehicles. It has three ticket machines, a bus connection to neighboring Bridgeport, and handicapped access.

Roads
Stratford is served by several major highways, including Interstate 95 (Connecticut Turnpike), U.S. Route 1 (Boston Post Road) (Boston Avenue and Barnum Avenue), the Merritt Parkway (Route 15), Route 108 (Nichols Avenue and King Street), Route 110 (East Main Street and River Road), Route 113 (Lordship Boulevard and Main Street), and Route 130 (Stratford Avenue and Ferry Boulevard).

Interstate 95 toll booths
In January 1983 a truck slammed into a line of cars waiting to pay a toll on Interstate 95 in Stratford, killing seven people. This accident was one of the reasons toll booths were removed throughout the state.

Government

The Town of Stratford operated under a council-manager government from 1921 until 2005 when it changed to a mayor-council type of government. The first mayor, James Miron, was elected in November 2005 to a four-year term. The second mayor was John Harkins. The town has a ten-member town council, elected by district to two-year terms. It appoints one of its members to serve as chairman. The mayor and the council are responsible for setting policy through the enactment of ordinances and resolutions.
Current Mayor is Laura R. Hoydick (R)

Emergency services

Emergency medical services
Established in 1977, Stratford Emergency Medical Service (SEMS) is the state-licensed, third-service, advanced life support (paramedic) and basic life support, municipal EMS provider to the Town of Stratford. The department responds to approximately 7300 calls annually.[22]

Fire department
Established in 1909, the fire department operates out of four stations located throughout the town. The fire department staffs 4 engine companies, a truck company, a rescue unit, and a shift commander along with several specialized response units. The department responds to approximately 6000 calls annually.

Police department

Created in 1917, the Stratford Police Department has a force of 98 officers. The department's units include arson investigation, crime prevention, identification & forensic unit and narcotics & vice. Stratford also has a boat patrol, a K-9 unit, and an animal control unit.

Education

Public education
Public education in Stratford is managed by the Stratford Board of Education, which operates 13 schools: two high schools, two middle schools, and nine elementary schools. The district has about 6,800 students and 1,095 staff, including 577 teachers, counselors, and specialists.

High schools
 Frank Scott Bunnell High School
 Stratford High School
 A.L.P.H.A. (formerly S.A.F.E.), an alternative high school program of 55 students hosted at the Birdseye Municipal Complex

Middle schools
 Harry B. Flood Middle School
 David Wooster Middle School

Elementary schools
 Chapel Street Elementary School
 Franklin Elementary School
 Lordship Elementary School
 Nichols Elementary School
 Second Hill Lane Elementary School
 Stratford Academy: Johnson House (elementary) (3–6)
 Eli Whitney Elementary School
 Victoria Soto Elementary School 
 Wilcoxson Elementary School

Private education
Stratford has two private (Catholic) elementary and middle schools:
 St. James School (K–8)
 St. Mark School (K–8)

Higher education
 The Connecticut School of Broadcasting maintains a location in Stratford and certifies students in television anchoring, commercial radio performance and journalism.
 Porter and Chester Institute's main campus provides training programs in automotive technology, CAD, electronics, HVAC, medical assistance, and other trades.
 The Stratford School for Aviation Maintenance Technicians is located at Sikorsky Memorial Airport.

Local attractions

National Helicopter Museum
Located in the former Stratford railroad station, the National Helicopter Museum contains a photographic history of the helicopter and model helicopters. Notably, it displays the Lycoming T53 jet engine, designed by Dr. Anselm Franz and manufactured at the Stratford Army Engine Plant.

Boothe Memorial Park

The  Boothe homestead in the Putney area of Stratford is a rolling parkland containing the original Boothe homestead and an eclectic assortment of buildings collected by the Boothe brothers during their lives and added to by the Friends of Boothe.

A tollbooth that was in service from 1940 to 1988 on Connecticut's Merritt Parkway is on display in Boothe Memorial Park.

Shakespeare Festival Theatre

In 1955 Stratford became home to the American Shakespeare Theatre, an 1,100-seat theatre with grounds on the Housatonic River. The theatre featured such actors as Katharine Hepburn, James Earl Jones, Paul Newman, Jessica Tandy, Jane Alexander, Hal Holbrook, Roddy McDowall, Nina Foch and Will Geer. John Houseman served as its artistic director during the late 1950s.

The company operating the theater ceased operations in the mid-1980s, and the building has been vacant since then. In February 2005, the Town of Stratford received the deed for the Stratford Festival Shakespeare Theater from the state of Connecticut. In 2006 it selected a New York City development company to reopen the theater as a tourist destination, but the company's contract was terminated in July 2007 because of lack of progress. In 2019 the theatre burned to the ground.

Stratford Library Shakespeare 
Since 2002, the Hudson Shakespeare Company has presented one showing of their Shakespeare in the Park in the amphitheater behind the Stratford Library.

Sites on the National Register of Historic Places
 Boothe Homestead (1985)
 Capt. David Judson House (1973)
 Ephraim Wheeler House (1992)
 Isaac Lewis House (1991)
 Nathan B. Booth House (1992)
 Sterling Homestead (1976)
 Stratford Center Historic District (1983)
 Stratford Point Lighthouse (1990)
 Washington Bridge (2004)

Sterling House
Since 1932, Sterling House has served as a community center for Stratford. Housed in a donated 1886 Romanesque mansion that was previously the home of John William Sterling, it hosts recreational and leisure activities for adults and children, charity events, and volunteer activities. The grounds include a gazebo, a rose garden, and a  field.

Sports
Stratford is home to the Connecticut Brakettes women's fastpitch softball team. Formed in 1947 as the Raybestos Girl All-Stars, and later called the Raybestos Brakettes, they became known as the Stratford Brakettes in 1985 after Raybestos ceased its sponsorship. The team has posted 3,242 victories in 3,607 games played, as well as three world championships and 28 national A.S.A. championships, including a record eight consecutive titles from 1971 to 1978. They also captured three consecutive titles in 2002, 2003, and 2004. Their most recent title came in 2006. Nineteen former members have made the National Softball Hall of Fame, and 11 have been Olympians. I The Brakettes play at Frank DeLuca Hall of Fame Field.

Media

Movies filmed in Stratford
Movies filmed at least partially in Stratford:
 Butterfield Eight (1960)
 The Battle (2001)
 Carnauba: A Son's Memoir (2001)
 Zero Day (2003)
 Das Kraftei – Raketenjäger ME 163 Komet (2004)
 Boxes (2005)
 Store (2006)
 Listen to Your Heart (2009)
 All Good Things (2010)
 Daddy for Lunch (2010)
 Sketchy Future (2010)
 Sicarii (2011)

Newspapers
Stratford is served by Bridgeport's daily Connecticut Post and by the weekly digital Stratford Crier.  The Stratford Star cesed publication in 2012.

Sister cities
Stratford has five sister cities:
  Stratford-upon-Avon, Warwickshire, England, United Kingdom
  Stratford, New Zealand
  Stratford, Victoria, Australia
  Stratford, Ontario, Canada
  Stratford, Prince Edward Island, Canada

Notable people

 Andrew Adams (1736–1797), jurist, Connecticut delegate to the Continental Congress, state chief justice and signer of the Articles of Confederation, born in Stratford
 Raymond E. Baldwin (1893–1986), Stratford Town Court Prosecutor and Judge, United States Senator, and 72nd and 74th Governor of Connecticut
 Nathan Bangs (1778–1862), Methodist minister and second president of Wesleyan University
 William Beardsley (1605–1661), town founder buried in Stratford
 Adam Blakeman (1596–1665), Puritan leader who was a town founder and the first church minister
 Tyler Bunch, puppeteer and actor
 Efrain Chacurian, member of the National Soccer Hall of Fame in Oneonta, New York
 Javier Colon, singer-songwriter, winner of season one of The Voice, grew up in Stratford and graduated from Bunnell High School
 Joseph Platt Cooke (1730–1816), Continental Army colonel in the Revolutionary War, state politician, and twice a delegate to the Continental Congress, born in Stratford
 Tony Dovolani, ballroom dancer, cast member on Dancing with the Stars, used to reside in Stratford
 Anselm Franz (1900–1994), Austrian engineer, inventor of the Jumo 004 and T53 turbine engines
 Bancroft Gherardi (1832–1903), US Navy rear admiral and veteran of the Mexican–American War and American Civil War
 Joseph Hawley (1603–1690), town recorder, representative, shipbuilder and yeoman
 William Samuel Johnson (1727–1819), signer of the United States Constitution, first Senator for Connecticut, first President of Columbia University, born and died in Stratford
 Stephen King, author, briefly lived in Stratford as a child
 George Ayres Leavitt (1822–1888), early New York City publisher, lived in Stratford part-time
 Nancy Marchand (1928–2000), actress (Lou Grant, The Sopranos), resided in the Lordship section of Stratford
 Moby, songwriter-musician-singer, lived in Stratford (1974–1976), attending Birdseye Elementary School
 Kenneth H. Olsen, engineer and co-founder of Digital Equipment Corporation
 Tom Penders, college basketball coach and ESPN sports analyst, native of Stratford
 David Plant (1783–1851), member of the United States House of Representatives for the 20th Congress, Lieutenant Governor of Connecticut 1823–1827
 Igor Sikorsky, founder of Sikorsky Aircraft
 Loring Smith (1890–1981), Broadway and motion picture actor born in Stratford
 Victoria Leigh Soto (1985–2012), school teacher. Attended Stratford High School, resided in Stratford. Victim of the Sandy Hook Elementary School shooting. Currently rests at the Union Cemetery in Stratford
 John William Sterling (1844–1918), philanthropist, corporate attorney, and major benefactor of Yale University
 Kenneth Tigar, American actor and translator
 Gideon Tomlinson (1780–1854), noted lawyer, member of the United States House of Representatives (16th through 19th Congresses), Senator for Connecticut (22nd through 24th Congresses), and 25th Governor of Connecticut, born and interned in Stratford
 David Wooster, Major General in the American Revolutionary War, born in Stratford
 John Zaffis, paranormal investigator on the Syfy original series Haunted Collector

Notes

Further reading

 Calhoun, John D. & Lewis G. Knapp. Stratford: A Pictorial History, 1850–1970, (Images of America Series) Arcadia Publishing, 1999. 
 Knapp, Lewis G. In Pursuit of Paradise: History of the Town of Stratford, Connecticut. West Kennebunk, ME: Phoenix Publishing, 1989. 
 Orcutt, Samuel. A History of the Old Town of Stratford and the City of Bridgeport, Connecticut. New Haven, CT: Press of Tuttle, Morehouse & Taylor, 1886.
 Smith, Claude. The Stratford Devil. New York: Walker, 1984. 
 Wilcoxson, William Howard. History of Stratford, 1639–1939, Stratford, CT: Stratford Tercentenary Commission, 1939.

External links

 
 Stratford Library Association
 Stratford Historical Society

 
Towns in Fairfield County, Connecticut
Populated places established in 1639
1639 establishments in Connecticut
Towns in the New York metropolitan area
Towns in Connecticut
Populated coastal places in Connecticut